Kim Allen (born February 22, 1982) is an American actress of half Greek descent.

Early life
Allen was born and raised in a suburb of Springfield, Massachusetts. She earned a BFA in drama from New York University's Tisch School of the Arts, with minors in biology and anthropology.

Career
She formerly played 18-year-old Amanda Holden, Kim Delaney's daughter, in Lifetime's series Army Wives. She later appeared in Law & Order: Criminal Intent as Avery Burton. In the early 2000s, she made an appearance in a Hot Pockets advertisement promoting an updated line including higher quality ingredients. The ad tagline "irresistibly hot", associated her attractiveness with the desirability of the frozen microwaveable sandwich.

In 2016, she played the role of Jacqueline Kennedy in the biographical film LBJ (2016).

Filmography

Film

Television

Television
 Lipstick Jungle (1 episode, 2008) as Leading Woman
 Law & Order: Criminal Intent (1 episode, 2008) as Avery Hubert
 Guiding Light (4 episodes, 2009) as Lara Fasano
 The Beautiful Life: TBL (1 episode, 2009) as Rachelle
Film
 Sonnet for a Towncar (2010) as Claire 
 Violet Tendencies (2010) as Salome 
 Going Down in LA-LA Land (2011) as Ms. Campbell 
 Curfew (2012) as Maggie
 Scavenger Killers (2014) as Agent Templeton
 Lyle (2014) as Taylor

References

External links

1982 births
Living people
American television actresses
Actresses from Massachusetts
Actors from Springfield, Massachusetts
21st-century American actresses